Dual registration refers to an arrangement between clubs whereby a player continues to be registered to his current club and is also registered to play for a club in a lower league. The system is mostly aimed at young Super League players who are thought to be not quite ready to make the step up to ‘week in, week out’ first team duties but for whom first team match experience is likely to be beneficial for their development but this has been extended to Championship teams dual registering with League 1 clubs.

Dual registration 
Clubs in both the Super League and the Championships benefit from the new dual registration system which was introduced for the 2013 season. The new system is intended to complement the existing player loan system.

Only Super League and Championship players can be dual registered and the receiving club must be a club in a league lower than their own, meaning that Super League to Super League or Championship to Championship club Dual registrations are not available.
A dual registered player will be eligible to play and train with both clubs in a format agreed between the clubs, subject to registration, salary cap and competition eligibility rules.
The player is restricted to playing in one fixture per scheduled round of fixtures in any given week and would not be eligible to play for his Super League club on a Thursday and in a Championship fixture at the weekend, for example.
A receiving club will be limited to a total of five dual registered players per matchday squad.

Clubs
Eleven Super League clubs currently use the dual registration system.  Teams who are also in the Reserve Championship are Wigan, Warrington, Hull FC, St Helens, Sheffield, Keighley, Halifax, and Dewsbury.

Championship clubs also have Dual registration deals with other with League One clubs.

References

External links

Super League